Numerical Wind Tunnel (数値風洞) was an early implementation of the vector parallel architecture developed in a joint project between National Aerospace Laboratory of Japan and Fujitsu. It was the first supercomputer with a sustained performance of close to 100 Gflop/s for a wide range of fluid dynamics application programs. It stood out at the top of the TOP500 during 1993-1996. With 140 cores, the Numerical Wind Tunnel reached a Rmax of 124.0 GFlop/s and a Rpeak of 235.8 GFlop/s in November 1993.

It consisted of parallel connected 166 vector processors with a gate delay as low as 60 ps in the Ga-As chips. The resulting cycle time was 9.5 ns. The processor had four independent pipelines each capable of executing two Multiply-Add instructions in parallel resulting in a peak speed of 1.7 Gflop/s per processor. Each processor board was equipped with 256 Megabytes of central memory.

References

1993 in science
Fujitsu supercomputers
One-of-a-kind computers
Supercomputing in Japan
Vector supercomputers
Wind tunnels